Claudio Iannone (born 5 November 1963) is an Argentine former cyclist. He competed in the sprint event at the 1984 Summer Olympics.

References

External links
 

1963 births
Living people
Argentine male cyclists
Olympic cyclists of Argentina
Cyclists at the 1984 Summer Olympics
Place of birth missing (living people)
20th-century Argentine people